The 1997–98 season was Sport Lisboa e Benfica's 94th season in existence and the club's 64th consecutive season in the top flight of Portuguese football, covering the period from 1 July 1997 to 30 June 1998. It involved Benfica competing in the Primeira Divisão and the Taça de Portugal. Benfica qualified for the UEFA Cup by finishing 3rd in the previous Primeira Divisão.

After three seasons without a league title, Benfica signed more than ten players in an attempt to regain competitiveness. Important signings were 21 year-old Nuno Gomes who scored 15 league goals in the past season, and together with Sánchez (also signed), were vital in denying Benfica the opportunity to retain the Portuguese Cup in the 1997 Taça de Portugal Final. An addition with high expectations was Paulo Nunes, the 1996 Brasileirão top-scorer, which was meant to partner with João Pinto in the attack, but ended clashing with him. Manuel José briefly led the team, being replaced due to poor results after five games. Mário Wilson returned for a third spell of just a month, until Scottish manager Graeme Souness assumed the team in November. Although not an immediate success, changes in the squad during the winter transfer market made instant impact, with an ensuing seven-game winning streak helping the team secure a second-place finish, and benefiting from recent changes in format, qualify for the UEFA Champions League.

Season summary
After a season that broke negative records, Benfica started the new one hoping to improve its previous year's performance. Manuel José continued as manager, with the opportunity to rebuild the squad in his preference. Despite many misses, new signings Nuno Gomes, Gamarra and Scott Minto jumped immediately to the starting eleven.

The season opened with a convincing home against S.C. Campomaiorense, but this impact was immediately cut short. In the first game as visitor, Benfica conceded the first loss; in the next matchday, the club had to fight not to lose at home against Académica. In the first European game, a second loss, against Bastia, which had qualified using the Intertoto Cup.  A second league loss in four games led to the immediate dismissal of José, as disciplinary problems also emerged, mainly the incident involving João Pinto and a fireman after the game in Vila do Conde.

Benfica resorted to Mário Wilson for a third time in two years, until a permanent substitute was found. The experienced manager was unable to revert the one-nill deficit brought from first leg of the UEFA Cup, ending European football in September for the first time since 1990–91. The situation did not improve in the league, with a five-game win less spree, seeing the club drop to eleventh. Wilson's influence only made effect on late October, with three straight wins, one counting for the Portuguese Cup.

After a presidential change, Benfica hired Graeme Souness on 1 November. The Scottish manager had spells at Rangers, Liverpool, and had worked abroad, in Turkey and Italy, but was mostly unheard of in Portuguese football. In his first month, the helped the team climb from sixth to fourth, only three points from second place. Despite this, Benfica was still losing much needed points, entering the Clássico against Porto with an eleven-point difference. After a losing in Estádio das Antas, and with two more points lost at home, the winter signings, Poborský, Brian Deane and Luís Carlos began to impact the team performance, helping the club start a winning run, that saw them climb to second place, and beat Sporting C.P. by four-one in Alvalade in February. The only downside was the semi-final exit in the Portuguese cup, at the hands of S.C. Braga; the fourth time in history that Braga had eliminated Benfica (1966, 1979, and 1982).

In March, even though the team lost five points, the reappearance of João Pinto after an injury suffered in the Clássico gave Souness one more option to partner with Nuno Gomes. Isolated in second and with Porto clinching the title in late April, the team faced them only fighting for their honour. With a three-nil victory, the team exacted revenge from the defeat in January. The season ended with a seven-one victory over Leça; the biggest home win in the league, as Souness was certain to remain in charge.

Competitions

Overall record

Primeira Divisão

League table

Results by round

Matches

Taça de Portugal

UEFA Cup

First round

Friendlies

Player statistics
The squad for the season consisted of the players listed in the tables below, as well as staff member Manuel José (manager), Mário Wilson (manager) and Graeme Souness (manager).

|}

Transfers

In

Out

Out by loan

References

Bibliography
 

S.L. Benfica seasons
Benfica